The Men's team épée event of the 2015 World Fencing Championships was held on 17–18 July 2015.

Medalists

Draw

Finals

Top half

Section 1

Section 2

Bottom half

Section 3

Section 4

Placement rounds

5–8th place

9–16th place

13–16th place

Final classification

References

 Bracket

2015 World Fencing Championships